Ralph "Rafael" Garcia (born December 14, 1948 in Los Angeles, California) is a former Major League Baseball pitcher. Garcia played for the San Diego Padres in 1972 and 1974. He batted and threw right-handed. He then played in the Mexican League from 1976 through 1988, mainly for the Indios de Ciudad Juarez. He was inducted into the Mexican Professional Baseball Hall of Fame in 2005.

External links

1951 births
Living people
Algodoneros de Unión Laguna players
American baseball players of Mexican descent
American expatriate baseball players in Mexico
Baseball players from Los Angeles
Indios de Ciudad Juárez (minor league) players
Major League Baseball pitchers
Mexican Baseball Hall of Fame inductees
Mexican League baseball pitchers
San Diego Padres players
Saraperos de Saltillo players
Rieleros de Aguascalientes players
Venados de Mazatlán players